The following highways are numbered 244:

Canada
 Manitoba Provincial Road 244
 Prince Edward Island Route 244

Costa Rica
 National Route 244

India
 National Highway 244 (India)

Japan
 Japan National Route 244

United States
 Interstate 244
 Arkansas Highway 244
 California State Route 244
 Connecticut Route 244
 Georgia State Route 244 (former)
 Indiana State Road 244
 Iowa Highway 244 (former)
 K-244 (Kansas highway)
 Kentucky Route 244
 Maryland Route 244
 Minnesota State Highway 244
 Montana Secondary Highway 244
 New Mexico State Road 244
 New York State Route 244
 Oregon Route 244
 Pennsylvania Route 244
 South Dakota Highway 244
 Tennessee State Route 244
 Texas State Highway 244 (former)
 Texas State Highway Spur 244
 Farm to Market Road 244 (Texas)
 Utah State Route 244 (former)
 Vermont Route 244
 Virginia State Route 244

See also
 List of highways numbered 243
 List of highways numbered 245